Brent Townsend is a Canadian nature artist who in 1996 designed the portrait of a polar bear in early summer on an ice floe that appears on the current Canadian 2 dollar coin. Born in Toronto, Townsend lives in Campbellford, Ontario.

References

External links
 Official site

20th-century Canadian painters
Canadian male painters
21st-century Canadian painters
Canadian portrait painters
Year of birth missing (living people)
Living people
Coin designers
20th-century Canadian male artists
21st-century Canadian male artists